Dr. Juan C. Angara Airport, also known as Baler Airport , is an airport serving the general area of Baler, the capital of the province of Aurora, located in the province of Aurora in the Philippines. It is named after Juan C. Angara, the father of former provincial governor Bella Angara and Senator Edgardo Angara, sometime in early 2006.

Located in Barangay San Isidro in the neighboring municipality of San Luis, some seven kilometers from Baler, the airport is classified as a community airport by the Civil Aviation Authority of the Philippines, the body of the Department of Transportation responsible for the operations of all public airports in the Philippines except the major international airports.

SEAir used to fly to the airport twice a week from Manila. Air Juan commenced regularly scheduled flights to the airport from their private seaplane base at CCP Complex along Manila Bay in March 2017 using their nine-seater amphibious aircraft.

Airlines and destinations

Gallery

See also
List of airports in the Philippines

References

External links
 

Airports in the Philippines
Transportation in Aurora (province)
Buildings and structures in Aurora (province)